Rusumo may refer to:

 Rusumo, Rwanda, a town in southeastern Rwanda
 Rusumo Falls, a prominent waterfall on the Rwanda–Tanzania border, close to Rusumo, Rwanda
 Rusumo District, a former district in the former Rwandan province of Kibungo
 Rusumo, Tanzania, a settlement in Ngara District, in the Kagera Region of Tanzania
 Rusumo Bridge, a bridge across the Kagera River, linking Rwanda and Tanzania, built in 1972
 Rusumo International Bridge, a wider bridge across the River Kagera, built in 2014
 Rusumo Hydroelectric Power Station, an 80 megawatt hydro power station at the site of the Rusumo Falls.